Veritatis may refer to :

Veritatis Splendor, an encyclical by Pope John Paul II
Viam agnoscere veritatis (disambiguation), a series of papal communications written by Pope Innocent IV to the Mongols